Semwal is one of the thirty-six subcastes of Sarola Brahmin from Uttarakhand. They are the sole custodians and pandits of the Gangotri temple. They fall under the category of Gauda Brahmins.

Etymology
The name "Semwal" originates from a place called Sem-Mukhem (Hindi:सेम-मुखेम) in Uttarakhand, abode to the shrine of Sem-Mukhem Nagraj (Hindi: सेममुखेम नागराज) often considered among the locals as the fifth shrine of the Chota Char Dham pilgrimage of which the Semwals are permanent serving priests. Apart from this, the name "Semwal" might also have originated from Sem village in Karnaprayag, Chamoli district.

See also
Sarola Brahmin

References 

Surnames
Indian surnames
Surnames of Indian origin
Surnames of Hindustani origin
Hindu surnames
Himalayan peoples
Social groups of India
Social groups of Uttarakhand
Brahmin communities of Uttarakhand
Toponymic surnames
People from Chamoli district